Patrice Martin-Lalande (born December 2, 1947) was a member of the National Assembly of France from 1993 to 2017.  He represented Loir-et-Cher's 2nd constituency, as a member of Rally for the Republic, then the Union for a Popular Movement.

References

External links

1947 births
Living people
Union for a Popular Movement politicians
Deputies of the 10th National Assembly of the French Fifth Republic
Deputies of the 11th National Assembly of the French Fifth Republic
Deputies of the 12th National Assembly of the French Fifth Republic
Deputies of the 13th National Assembly of the French Fifth Republic
Deputies of the 14th National Assembly of the French Fifth Republic